ECCT may refer to:

 Engineering Casualty Control Training held on board ships of the United States Navy
 Enhanced Computer-Controlled Teletext, an electronic circuit for Teletext